Riz à l'impératrice is an elaborate molded version of rice pudding in French haute cuisine. Rice pudding is mixed with Bavarian cream, set in a charlotte mold, turned out and then decorated with candied fruits macerated in alcohol such as kirsch or maraschino.

The dessert is said to have been named in honor of the Empress Eugénie de Montijo, Empress of France from 1853 to 1870.

Marcel Proust refers to the dish in Volume one of his In Search of Lost Time.

References

French desserts
Rice dishes